The Socialist Workers' Party of Germany (SAPD) was a centrist Marxist political party in Germany. It was formed as a left-wing party with around 20,000 members which split off from the SPD in the autumn of 1931. In 1931, the remnants of Independent Social Democratic Party of Germany (USPD) merged into the party and in 1932 some Communist Party dissenters also joined the group as well as a part from the Communist Party Opposition. Nevertheless, its membership remained small. From 1933, the group's members worked illegally against Nazism.

History 
In his home town of Lübeck, the young Herbert Karl Frahm, later known as Willy Brandt, joined the SAPD against the advice of his mentor Julius Leber. In his autobiography, Brandt wrote: In autumn 1931, Nazis and German nationalists, the SA and Der Stahlhelm joined together to form the "Harzburg Front". [...] It was just at this time that the left wing of the social democrats split off, as a result of measures connected to organisation and discipline by the party leaders. A few Reichstag assemblymen, a number of active party groups – above all in Saxony – and not least a large proportion of young Socialists followed the people who were calling for the founding of a Socialist Workers' Party.

In 1934, the youth of SAPD took part in the foundation of the International Bureau of Revolutionary Youth Organizations. The congress was held in the Netherlands and broken up by Dutch police. Several SAPD delegates were handed over to German authorities. The congress then re-convened in Lille. Brandt was elected to the Secretariat of the organization and worked in Norway for the Bureau.

The SAPD was affiliated to the International Revolutionary Marxist Centre, but it broke with the main party of that international (the Independent Labour Party) over the question of the united front and popular front.

During the Second World War, some SAPD members emigrated to Great Britain and worked for the party there. Many of those became members of the SPD, therefore the SAPD was not re-founded anew after the Second World War. Willy Brandt eventually became the leader of the SPD, one of West Germany's major political parties of the modern era, being elected Chancellor of Germany in 1969.

See also 
 
  (Socialist Protection League)

References

Bibliography 
  Repr. Hannover: Politladen, 1971; 2. Repr. Hamburg: Junius, 1999 (the classic account).

External links 
 "Where is the SAP going?"

Social democratic parties in Germany
Political parties in the Weimar Republic
Defunct socialist parties in Germany
Political parties established in 1931
Political history of Germany
1931 establishments in Germany
Marxist parties
International Revolutionary Marxist Centre